Sergei Sergeyevich Gorenko (6 April 1982 – 16 September 2022) was a prosecutor and politician of the Luhansk People's Republic. He served as Prosecutor General from 2019 to 2022.

Gorenko was killed in an explosion from an improvised explosive device in Luhansk, on 16 September 2022, at the age of 40.

References

1982 births
2022 deaths
People of the Luhansk People's Republic
People from Sverdlovsk, Luhansk Oblast
East Ukrainian Volodymyr Dahl National University alumni
People killed in the 2022 Russian invasion of Ukraine
Civilians killed in the Russian invasion of Ukraine
Ukrainian collaborators with Russia